The Skaggs School of Pharmacy and Pharmaceutical Sciences is a graduate-level pharmacy school at the University of California, San Diego, United States. It offers five educational programs:     
Doctor of Pharmacy (Pharm.D.) degree awarded in a four-year program
Joint Bachelor of Science (BS) in Chemistry and Pharm.D. degree awarded in a seven-year program in cooperation with UCSD's Department of Chemistry and Biochemistry
Ph.D. degree in pharmaceutical and biomedical sciences
Post Pharm.D. pharmacy practice and specialty residencies and research fellowships
A continuing education program for practicing pharmacists.

Prior to the establishment of the school, San Diego was the largest metropolitan city in the United States without a local pharmacy school.

History
The Skaggs School was authorized by the Regents of the University of California in July 2000. The school was named on November 4, 2004, in recognition of a $30 million gift, the largest ever to UC San Diego Health Sciences, from the Skaggs Institute of Research. The inaugural class began in the Fall of 2002 with 25 Doctorate of Pharmacy students, and graduated the first class of students in the Spring of 2006.

On May 2, 2006, the school opened the doors of its new four story and  facility to house all of its academic and research operations.

Currently
As of 2015, enrollment is 240 Pharm.D. students, 60 Ph.D. students and 30 pharmacy residents. The school accepts 60 Pharm.D. students per year.

References

External links
The Skaggs School of Pharmacy and Pharmaceutical Sciences

Pharmacy schools in California
University of California, San Diego
Universities and colleges in San Diego
Educational institutions established in 2002
2002 establishments in California
UC San Diego Health